The WTA Tier I tournaments were Women's Tennis Association tennis elite tournaments held from 1990 until the end of the 2008 season. From 1988 to 1990, the different levels of WTA tournaments were referred to by the term 'Category', and there were 5 categories. Two of the Tier I tournaments, Indian Wells and Miami, were also joint events held simultaneously with the ATP Tour Masters Series.

There were initially 6 Tier I tournaments held annually from 1990. The list expanded to 8 events in 1993, 9 in 1997 and 10 in 2004, before being scaled back to 9 for 2008.

In 2009 the WTA changed the tournament categories, so that the majority of Tier I and Tier II tournaments were in one category, Premier Tournaments, split into three categories.

Events

Singles results

1990

1991

1992

1993

1994

1995

1996

1997

1998

1999

2000

2001

2002

2003

2004

2005

2006

2007

2008

Singles champions

Per year

Per player

 DOH = Doha, IND = Indian Wells, MIA = Miami, CHA = Charleston, BER = Berlin, ROM = Rome, CAN = Canada, TOK = Tokyo, MOS = Moscow, SAN = San Diego, ZUR = Zürich, CHI = Chicago, BOC = Boca Raton, PHI = Philadelphia.
 Miami before 2000 was held in Key-Biscayne, Charleston before 2001 was held in Hilton Head, Tokyo in 1993 was held in Yokohama; Chicago has been a Tier I only in 1990, Boca Raton in 1991 and 1992, Philadelphia from 1993 to 1995, Zürich from 1993 to 2007 and San Diego from 2004 to 2007.

Tier I records & statistics

Singles
 The most titles won:  Martina Hingis, 17
 The most final appearances:  Martina Hingis, 27
 The most wins of a particular Tier I tournament: 5  Steffi Graf, Berlin (1991-1994, 1996)  Martina Hingis, Tokyo (1997, 1999-2000, 2002, 2007)  Serena Williams, Miami (2002-2004, 2007-2008)
 The most consecutive wins of a particular Tier I tournament:
 Steffi Graf, Berlin, 4 (1991—1994)
 Conchita Martinez, Rome, 4 (1993-1996)
 Monica Seles, Canadian Open, 4 (1995—1998)

 Fastest to...
 5 titles: in 1 year,  Hingis (Tokyo 2000 - Zurich 2000)
 10 titles: in 3 years,  Hingis (Tokyo 1997 - Tokyo 2000)
 15 titles: in 5 years,  Hingis (Tokyo 1997 - Tokyo 2002)
 17 titles: in 12 years,  Hingis (Tokyo 1997 - Tokyo 2008)
 Quadruple titles:
Tokyo—Miami—Canada—Zurich ("The Hard Quadruple")  Hingis, 2000
 Triple titles:
Indian Wells—Miami—Canada ("The Hard Triple")  Clijsters, 2005
Indian Wells—San Diego—Zurich ("The Hard Triple")  Sharapova, 2006
 Double titles:

 Winners of 6 series tournaments on hard:
  Hingis (Tokyo 96, Miami 97, Indian Wells 98, Canada 99, Zurich 00, Moscow 00).

 Winners of 5 series tournaments on hard:
  Sharapova (Tokyo 05, Indian Wells 06, San Diego 06, Zurich 06, Doha 08).

 Winners of 3 series tournaments on clay:
  Martinez (Rome 93, Hilton Head 94, Berlin 98).
  Hingis (Hilton Head 97, Rome 98, Berlin 99).

 Winners of the series tournaments on three surfaces:
  Navratilova (Chicago 90, Hilton Head 90, Tokyo 93).

A number of players hold records for winning the tournaments multiple times, while other records are achieved for successive tournament wins, mini-combination victories amongst others.
 Conchita Martínez won the Italian Open four straight times, from 1993 to 1996, and reached the final in 1997.
 Martina Hingis has won all the different Tier I tournaments except for the San Diego event, which became a Tier I event in 2004, during her three-year withdrawal from the sport which ended in late 2005.

References

 Tier 1
Recurring sporting events established in 1990
Recurring sporting events disestablished in 2008